Postinternationalism is a term coined by academic James N. Rosenau to describe "an apparent trend in which more of the interactions that sustain world politics unfold without the direct involvement of states". Postinternational approaches to international relations theory lay emphasis on the role of non-state actors,<ref>Chong, Alan, The post-international challenge to foreign policy: signposting 'plus non-state politics', Review of International Studies, (2002), 28, p783-795</ref>  the existence of international norms as well as the process of globalisation and the existence of intrastate (rather than interstate) violence. As such postinternational approaches rejects many the tenets of realist approaches to international relations theory though it accepts that international politics is anarchic. Rosneau's paradigm of postinternationalism is sometimes referred to in academic literature as "turbulence theory".

 See also 
 Postnationalism

References

Further reading
Beyond Postinternationalism' in Pondering Postinternationalism: a paradigm for the twenty-first century?'' ed. Heidi Hobbs, Albany, State University of New York Press, (2002), p 3-43

External links
Definition of Postinternationalism

International relations terminology
International relations theory
Internationalism